The 1963 Individual Long Track European Championship was the seventh edition of the Long Track European Championship. The final was held on 8 September 1963 in Malmö, Sweden.

The title was won by Bertil Stridh of Sweden for the second successive year.

Venues
1st Qualifying Round - Pori, 26 May 1963
Qualifying Round 2 - Scheeßel, 26 May 1963
Qualifying Round 3 - Mühldorf am Inn, 16 June 1963
Final -  Malmö, 8 September 1963

Final Classification

References 

Sports competitions in Malmö
Motor
Motor
International sports competitions hosted by Sweden